The Ningbo Museum, also known as the Yinzhou Museum or the Ningbo Historic Museum, is a museum in the city of Ningbo in Zhejiang Province, China.  It is located in Yinzhou District and opened on December 5, 2008. The museum focuses on Ningbo area history and traditional customs.

Architecture

Ningbo Museum is designed by Wang Shu, the first Chinese citizen to win the Pritzker Architecture Prize in 2012. The design is a conceptual combination of mountains, water and oceans, as the East China Sea has played an important role in the history of Ningbo. Features of Jiangnan residences are integrated into the museum design by decorations made from old tiles and bamboo.

The first floor of the museum is constructed as a whole part, while the building starts to tilt on the second floor, giving the whole building a mountain and also a boat shape. This design alludes the geographical feature in Ningbo as well as the importance of overseas commerce in its history, thus making the museum a symbol of Ningbo history and culture.

The outer wall decoration of Ningbo Museum is made in two ways. Some walls are decorated by millions of tiles collected in local areas. This sort of decoration itself was a common way of building an economical house in old days in Ningbo when cements are not introduced. Other walls are decorated with cement-covered bamboos. It is reported that Ningbo Museum was the first museum built with large number of used materials. Ningbo Tengtou Pavilion in Shanghai World Expo also employed the similar decoration.

Ningbo Museum won the Lu Ban Prize in 2009, the top architecture prize in China.

Permanent exhibits

Ningbo history exhibit

Located on the second floor of the museum, this is the main exhibit of the museum, showing the history of Ningbo from the Hemudu culture until the Republic of China. Major stories are about ancient cultures, the expansion of the city, overseas commerce, the development of Eastern Zhejiang Scholars and Ningbo Commercial Group. Large amount of artefacts, historic photographs and models are displayed.

Ningbo custom exhibit

This exhibit is located on the third floor of the museum. Wax models and mock buildings and modern electronic techniques are used to show a traditional commercial street in Ningbo. Intangible cultural heritages of the city are also on display.

Bamboo art exhibit
This exhibit is located on the third floor of the museum, displaying old bamboo artefacts donated by Qin Bingnian, the son of the collector, Qin Kangxiang.

Li Yuan Photography Arts Museum

The Li Yuan Photography Arts Museum, also designed by Wang Shu using materials similar to the main Ningbo Museum, opened on September 28, 2013 as a separate pavilion of 1,000 square meters space primarily used for temporary photography exhibits. It is located in the Wu San Fang on the north gate of Luzhou Park. and is named after Chinese photographer Li Yuan who was born in Ningbo.

References

External links

Ningbo Museum on archdaily.com

National first-grade museums of China
Museums in Zhejiang
Buildings and structures in Ningbo
Infrastructure completed in 2008
Wang Shu buildings
Yinzhou District, Ningbo